Psilogaster is a monotypic moth genus in the family Lasiocampidae first described by Reichenbach in 1817. Its only species, Psilogaster loti, described by Ferdinand Ochsenheimer in 1810, is found in south-western Europe and North Africa.

The wingspan is 27–35 mm.

The larvae feed on Cistus salvifolius, Cistus albidus, Cistus populifolius, Cistus ladanifer, Cistus laurifolius, Cistus clusii and possibly Rosmarinus officinalis and Helianthemum.

Subspecies
Psilogaster loti loti
Psilogaster loti algeriensis Baker, 1885 (Morocco to Libya)
Psilogaster loti simulatrix Chrétien, 1910 (Tunisia, Libya)

References

Lasiocampinae
Monotypic moth genera
Moths of Europe
Moths of Africa
Taxa named by Ferdinand Ochsenheimer